is located in Midori-ku, Chiba, Japan. It opened on 3 November 2010 and is the country's first museum dedicated to Realist painting. Tomohiko Yamanashi & Taro Nakamoto (Nikken Sekkei） were the architects.

See also

 Toke Station

References

External links
 Homepage

Museums in Chiba Prefecture
Art museums and galleries in Japan
Buildings and structures in Chiba (city)
Art museums established in 2010
2010 establishments in Japan